Joseph Muzondo (born 1953) is a Zimbabwean painter and sculptor.

Taught informally in working stone by his uncle, Muzondo subsequently joined National Gallery B.A.T. Workshop in Harare, Zimbabwe. He has studied textile design in Tanzania and graphic arts in Austria, and has exhibited worldwide. His work is in the collections of the National Gallery of Zimbabwe.

References

External links
Brief career sketch and a list of exhibitions and awards

Living people
Place of birth missing (living people)
1953 births
20th-century Zimbabwean painters
20th-century Zimbabwean sculptors
21st-century Zimbabwean painters
21st-century Zimbabwean sculptors